Atypical adenomatous hyperplasia is a subtype of pneumocytic hyperplasia in the lung. It can be a precursor lesion of in situ adenocarcinoma of the lung (bronchioloalveolar carcinoma). 
In prostate tissue biopsy, it can be confused for adenocarcinoma of the prostate.  The needle biopsy rate is less than 1%.

Pathology

Morphological differential diagnosis 
 Multifocal micronodular pneumocyte hyperplasia (MMPH)
 in situ pulmonary adenocarcinoma (bronchioloalveolar carcinoma – BAC)

Variants 
 multiple atypical adenomatous hyperplasia
 disseminated AAH

Histopathological images

See also 
 EGFR
 KRAS

References 

Pulmonary lesion